The American Hockey League is a minor professional ice hockey league in the United States and Canada. It serves as the top developmental league for the National Hockey League. The league played its first season in 1936 as the International-American Hockey League, a "circuit of mutual convenience" formed  when the Northeast-based Canadian-American Hockey League and the Midwest-based International Hockey League agreed to play an interlocking schedule. After two seasons, the leagues formally merged into a unified league under the IAHL name. After the 1939–40 season, the league became known as the American Hockey League.

The 1938–39 season—the IAHL's first as a fully merged league—saw the two-time defending Eastern Amateur Hockey League champion Hershey Bears added as an eighth member club to replace the Buffalo Bisons that had been forced to fold 11 games into the 1936–37 season when the roof of its arena collapsed in a snowstorm. The Bears remain the oldest continuously operating hockey team in any league in North America outside of the NHL. The Rochester Americans, who joined as an expansion team for the 1956–57 season, are the second oldest.

Seasons
Franchises in their current form are in boldface, i.e. Hershey Bears.

References

AHL official site
AHL Hall of Fame
Historic standings and statistics - at Internet Hockey Database

 
Seasons